Aifric Keogh (born 9 July 1992) is an Irish rower. She competed in the women's coxless four event at the 2020 Summer Olympics and won a bronze medal. Along with her team-mates, she was named as the Irish Times/Sport Ireland Sportswoman for July 2021.

References

External links
 
 Aifric Keogh at Rowing Ireland
 
 

1992 births
Living people
Irish female rowers
Olympic rowers of Ireland
Rowers at the 2020 Summer Olympics
Place of birth missing (living people)
Medalists at the 2020 Summer Olympics
Olympic medalists in rowing
Olympic bronze medalists for Ireland
21st-century Irish women
20th-century Irish women